The Alsea River flows  from Alsea, an unincorporated community in the coastal mountains of the U.S. state of Oregon, to the Pacific Ocean near the city of Waldport. It begins at the confluence of the North Fork Alsea River and the South Fork Alsea River and ends in Alsea Bay, a wide estuary at Waldport. The river flows generally west-northwest in a winding course through the mountains of southern Benton and Lincoln counties, passing near the unincorporated community of Tidewater and through the Siuslaw National Forest. Its drainage basin extends into Lane County, along the headwaters of the South Fork Alsea River.

The Alsea River supports runs of chinook and coho salmon, as well as steelhead and coastal cutthroat trout. The Alsea River Fish Hatchery is along one of its tributaries, the North Fork Alsea River.

Course
Formed by the confluence of the South Fork Alsea River and the North Fork Alsea River, the stream meanders through the Siuslaw National Forest for all but the last  of its course.

During its first  or so, the river receives Cathcart Creek, Roberts Creek, and Mill Creek, all from the right, and passes Mill Creek Boat Landing on the right. Oregon Route 34 parallels the river on the north; that is, on the right facing downstream.

Flowing around Stoney Mountain, the Alsea River receives Five Rivers and Lake Creek from the left, passes Blackberry Campground on the left, receives Grass Creek and Brush Creek from the left and Schoolhouse Creek from the right, passes Mike Bauer Picnic Grounds on the right and, shortly thereafter, a USGS gauging station on the right  from the mouth. About  further downstream, the river passes Slide Campground on the right before entering Hellion Rapids at coordinates .

About  later, it leaves the Siuslaw National Forest. Shortly thereafter, it receives Southworth Creek and Constantine Creek from the left and Drift Creek from the right. As part of the bay, it receives Lint Creek from the left, passes Waldport on the left, flows under U.S. Route 101, and enters the Pacific Ocean at the mouth of the bay.

See also
 List of rivers of Oregon
 Cascade Falls (Lincoln County, Oregon)

Notes and references

External links

 
Rivers of Oregon
Rivers of Benton County, Oregon
Rivers of Lane County, Oregon
Rivers of Lincoln County, Oregon
Drainage basins of the Pacific Ocean
Oregon Coast Range
Siuslaw National Forest
Oregon placenames of Native American origin